Line of Fire is a film documentary produced by Cromwell Productions that shows historical battlefields presented in an animated environment.

Episode list
 Mons
 Gallipoli
 The Somme
 Cambrai
 Stalingrad
 Arnhem
 The Battle of the Bulge
 Battle of Berlin
 The Six Day War
 Goose Green
 The Fall of Port Stanley
 The Gulf War

References

History (American TV channel) original programming
American military television series
2002 American television series debuts
2002 American television series endings